Cheyenne County Municipal Airport  is a public airport located one mile (2 km) south of the central business district of St. Francis, a city in Cheyenne County, Kansas, United States. This airport is publicly owned by City of St. Francis.

Although most U.S. airports use the same three-letter location identifier for the FAA and IATA, Cheyenne County Municipal Airport is assigned SYF by the FAA but has no designation from the IATA (which assigned SYF to Silva Bay on Gabriola Island in British Columbia, Canada). The airport's ICAO identifier is KSYF.

Facilities and aircraft

 Runway 9/27: 1,799 x 280 ft (548 x 85 m), surface: turf
 Runway 13L/31R: 2,833 x 180 ft (863 x 55 m), surface: turf
 Runway 13R/31L: 3,138 x 50 ft (956 x 15 m), surface: asphalt
 Runway 18/36: 2,313 x 280 ft (705 x 85 m), surface: turf

For 12-month period ending June 7, 2006, the airport had 3,950 aircraft operations, an average of 10 per day: 96% general aviation and air taxi. There are 12 aircraft based at this airport, all single-engine.

References

External links
Grace Flying Service, the airport's fixed-base operator
Stearman Fly-In, held annually at the airport

Airports in Kansas
Buildings and structures in Cheyenne County, Kansas